KTXJ-FM (102.7 FM) is a radio station airing a Southern Gospel format licensed to Jasper, Texas, United States. The station is currently owned by Cross Texas Media, Inc.

References

External links
KTXJ-FM's official website

Southern Gospel radio stations in the United States
TXJ-FM